Saîf-Eddine Khaoui (born 27 April 1995) is a professional footballer who plays as a midfielder for  club Clermont. Born in France, he plays for the Tunisia national team.

Club career

Tours
Khaoui is a youth exponent from Tours. He made his Ligue 2 debut on 14 February 2014 against Istres in a 1–0 away loss.

Marseille
On 18 June 2016, Tours confirmed that they had reached an agreement with Marseille for the sale of Khaoui. He made his league debut on 14 August 2016 in a 0–0 draw with Toulouse, replacing Florian Thauvin at halftime.

Loan to Troyes
On 26 July 2017, having spent only a month at Marseille, Khaoui was sent out on loan to Troyes. He made his debut on 5 August 2017 in a 1–1 draw with Rennes.

Loan to Cannes
On 31 August 2018, the last day of the 2018 transfer window, Khaoui joined Caen on loan for the 2018–19 season.

Clermont
On 14 August 2021, Khaoui joined newly-promoted Ligue 1 side Clermont on a two year deal.

International career
Khaoui was called up by the Tunisia U21 squad, and scored in his debut against Nigeria U21. He was called up to the Tunisia Olympic team for their matches in 2016.

Khaoui made his senior debut for the Tunisia national team in a friendly 1–0 win over Iran on 23 March 2018.

In June 2018 he was named in Tunisia's 23-man squad for the 2018 FIFA World Cup in Russia.

Personal life
Khaoui was born and raised in France to parents of Tunisian descent.

Career statistics

Scores and results list Tunisia's goal tally first, score column indicates score after each Khaoui goal.

References

1995 births
Living people
French sportspeople of Tunisian descent
Tunisian footballers
French footballers
Footballers from Paris
Association football midfielders
Tunisia international footballers
2018 FIFA World Cup players
Ligue 1 players
Ligue 2 players
Championnat National 2 players
INF Clairefontaine players
Entente SSG players
Tours FC players
Olympique de Marseille players
ES Troyes AC players
Stade Malherbe Caen players
Clermont Foot players
2021 Africa Cup of Nations players